Elatine hydropiper (vernacular name: eight-stamened waterwort) is a species of flowering plant belonging to the family Elatinaceae.

Its native range is Europe to Russian Far East.

It was first described by Carl Linnaeus in 1753.

References

External links 

 Elatine hydropiper images & occurrence data at GBIF

Elatinaceae
Taxa named by Carl Linnaeus
Plants described in 1753
Flora of Europe